Goldsworthy Ridge is a ridge extending north from Mount Henderson in the northeast part of the Framnes Mountains of Mac. Robertson Land, Antarctica. It was mapped by Norwegian cartographers from air photos taken by the Lars Christensen Expedition, 1936–37, and was named by the Antarctic Names Committee of Australia for R.W. Goldsworthy, a survey field assistant with the Australian National Antarctic Research Expeditions (Nella Dan) in 1962.

References

Ridges of Mac. Robertson Land